Kill Me Quick, I'm Cold is a 1967 Italian crime-comedy film written and directed by Francesco Maselli.

Plot 
Giovanna and Franco, a couple of Italian adventurers and swindlers, after trying to trick each other, decide to join forces.

Cast  
  
Monica Vitti as Giovanna
 Jean Sorel as Franco
 Roberto Bisacco as Sergio
 Daniela Surina as Christina
 Barbara Pilavin as Ruth Clay
 John Stacy as Albert Clay
 Tom Felleghy as Dick Marton
 Madeline Foy as Alice Martin 
 Enzo Maggio  
 Tullio Altamura

References

External links

1967 films
1960s crime comedy films
Films directed by Francesco Maselli
Commedia all'italiana
Italian crime comedy films
1967 comedy films
1960s Italian-language films
1960s Italian films